The Malaysian Football League, also known simply as the MFL, was created during the course of the privatisation of the Malaysian football league system. It was formerly known as Football Malaysia Limited Liability Partnership (FMLLP). The company operates and runs few entities in Malaysian football under its jurisdiction, which include the Malaysia Super League, the Malaysia M3 League, the Malaysia M4 League, the Malaysia M5 League, the Malaysia Cup, the Malaysia Challenge Cup, the Malaysia FA Cup and the Piala Sumbangsih. It aims to transform and move Malaysian football forward.

The Malaysia Super League and the Malaysia Premier League are at the top and second levels of the Malaysian football league system and are part of the Malaysian Football League, the country's primary football league competition. Contested by 24 clubs which are divided into two divisions, it operates on a system of promotion and relegation between them, along with the Malaysia M3 League (Third Level) and the Malaysia M4 League (Fourth Level) which are under the jurisdiction of the Amateur Football League, a subsidiary of the Malaysian Football League. 

The Malaysian Football League organises and keeps the official records of league and cup matches while enforcing the rules of professional football. Besides that, the company also oversees the development, certification, and registration of professional football players, coaches, and referees. The Malaysian Football League is also responsible for promoting professional football in Malaysia through broadcasts and other media outlets.

The Malaysian Football League is a corporation in which the 24 member clubs act as shareholders. Seasons run from February to November, with teams playing 22 matches each (playing each team in the league twice, home and away) totalling 132 matches in each league in the season. The number of games per season may vary if a team in a league drops out due to certain factors. Most games are played in the afternoons of Fridays and Saturdays, with other games played during weekday evenings.

History 
After the appointment of MP & Silva by the Football Association of Malaysia (FAM) as its Global Advisor for all media and commercial rights for an extensive lineup of FAM competitions, the Football Malaysia Limited Liability Partnership (FMLLP) was established to manage the top two tiers of Malaysian football league competition while the MP & Silva and FAM partnership's goal was to extend its broadcast reach and maximising the commercial potential of its properties. The partnership signified the first steps of the privatisation of the Malaysian professional leagues as their subsidiary holding company, the Football Malaysia Limited Liability Partnership (FMLLP), was established for the day-to-day administration of local club football at a league-wide level.

This deal was worth RM1.26 billion (S$470 million or £233 million) over a 15-year period commencing from 2016. However cracks in the agreement appeared later that year after reports emerged that promised levels of funding failed to materialise, with MP & Silva only offering a level of investment lower than FAM had originally turned down by other media parties prior to agreeing a partnership with the sports media agency.

In March 2018, the company was rebranded as the Malaysian Football League from Football Malaysia Limited Liability Partnership. The company aimed to be more dynamic and competitive, with the MFL now an independent organization and was no longer tied to FAM.

In 2019, a new subsidiary of the company was formed known as Amateur Football League (AFL) which was tasked to manage the third division and below. The AFL officially confirmed the formation of the Malaysia M3 League and the Malaysia M4 League as the third and fourth division of the Malaysian football league system as amateur league competitions. A total of 14 clubs were confirmed to compete in the inaugural season of the newly reformed third division, which replaced the former Malaysia FAM League while the Malaysia M4 League had state FA leagues and social leagues run in parallel to form the new fourth division.

Corporate structure 
Malaysian Football League structure consists of the following.
 League Congress.  This has 29 seats:  One seat from each of the participating Malaysia Super League and Malaysia Premier League teams and five from FAM.
 League Executive Committee.  This has three seats, filled by members of the Congress voted into the board for a particular term.

Competitions 
The Football Association of Malaysia formerly ran all of the top football competitions in Malaysia, before some of it was given to the Malaysian Football League as part of the privatisation efforts for further professionalisation of local football. The list below are competitions which are now managed by the MFL:
 Malaysia Super League
 Malaysia Premier League (until 2022)
 MFL Cup (U23 reserve league)
 Malaysia Cup
 Malaysia FA Cup
 Piala Sumbangsih
 MFL Challenge Cup
 Malaysia M3 League 
 Malaysia M4 League 
 Malaysia M5 League

Current title holders

References

External links 
 
 

Football in Malaysia